Council of Ministers is a traditional name given to the supreme executive organ in some governments. It is usually equivalent to the term cabinet. The term Council of State is a similar name that also may refer to a cabinet, but the terms are not equal in certain countries (for example, in Spain and India). Councils of Ministers are usually composed of those government ministers who are responsible for a ministry. They are usually led by a President of the Council of Ministers, a term that is commonly translated, or used synonymously, as prime minister or premier.

List of current Councils of Ministers 
 Council of Ministers of Albania
 Council of Ministers of Algeria
 Council of Ministers of Belarus
 Council of Ministers of Belgium
 Council of Ministers of Bhutan
 Council of Ministers of Bosnia and Herzegovina
 Council of Ministers of Bulgaria
 Council of Ministers of Cambodia
 Council of Ministers of Colombia
 Council of Ministers of Cuba
 Council of Ministers of Ethiopia
 Council of Ministers of France
 Council of Ministers of India
 Council of Ministers of the Isle of Man
 Council of Ministers of Italy
 Council of Ministers of Jersey
 Council of Ministers of Lebanon
 Council of Ministers of Mozambique
 Council of Ministers of the Netherlands
Council of Ministers of the Kingdom of the Netherlands
 Council of Ministers of Peru
 Council of Ministers of Poland
 Council of Ministers of Portugal
 Council of Ministers of Russia
 Council of Ministers of Saudi Arabia
 Council of Ministers of Somalia
 Council of Ministers of Spain
 Council of Ministers of Syria
 Council of Ministers of Thailand
 Council of Ministers of Turkey
 Council of Ministers of Vietnam

List of former Councils of Ministers 
 Council of Ministers of Afghanistan
 Council of Ministers of the German Democratic Republic
 Council of Ministers of the Hungarian People's Republic
 Council of Ministers of the Soviet Union
 Council of Ministers of the Ukrainian SSR

See also
 Council of the European Union (informally known as the Council of Ministers)
 Policy Council of Guernsey

Government institutions